Gandaki Zone was one of the fourteen zones of Nepal, comprising six districts, namely, Gorkha, Kaski, Lamjung, Manang, Syangja and Tanahu. Here is district wise List of Monuments which is in the Gandaki Zone.

Gandaki Zone
 List of monuments in Gorkha District 
 List of monuments in Kaski District 
 List of monuments in Lamjung District 
 List of monuments in Manang District 
 List of monuments in Syangja District 
 List of monuments in Tanahu District

References

Gandaki Zone
Gandaki Zone